Dehejia is an Indian surname:

Vidya Dehejia, professor of Indian and South Asian Art at Columbia University
Rajeev Dehejia, professor of public policy in the Robert F. Wagner Graduate School of Public Service at New York University
Harsha V. Dehejia (born c. 1938), allergist, author, and radio host, and Professor of Indian Studies at Carleton University